The National Martyrs' Memorial ( Jatiyo Sriti Soudho)  is the national monument of Bangladesh, built to honour and remember those who died during the War of Liberation and Genocide in 1971, which resulted in Bangladesh's independence. The monument is located in Savar, about 35 km north-west of the capital, Dhaka. It was designed by Syed Mainul Hossain and built by Concord Group.

History

Plans for the monument were initiated in 1976. Following the site selection, road and land development, a nationwide design competition was held in June 1978. Following evaluation of the 57 submissions, Syed Mainul Hossain's design was chosen. The main structure and the artificial lake and other facilities were completed in 1982. It was Inaugurated at 16 December 1982.

Description
The architecture is composed of seven pairs of triangular-shaped walls or prisms; the outermost pair being the shortest in height but widest in span, the inner pairs gradually change their aspect ratio and the innermost pair thus forms the peak point of the architecture. Each of these seven pairs of walls represents a significant chapter in the history of Bangladesh, namely the Language Movement in 1952, the 1954 provincial election victory of the United Front in 1954, the Constitution Movement in 1956, the movement against the Education Commission in 1962, the Six point movement in 1966, the Mass Uprising in 1969, and finally the climactic event of the Liberation War in 1971, through which Bangladesh became a separate independent sovereign state.

Gallery

See also
 Architecture of Bangladesh
 Fazlur Rahman Khan

References

External links

Monuments and memorials in Dhaka
National symbols of Bangladesh
Martyrs' monuments and memorials
Architecture in Bangladesh
Modernist architecture